Tormod Kark was a slave in Viking Era Norway. He appears in the saga Óláfs saga Tryggvasonar.

Biography
His life was closely tied to Haakon Sigurdsson (c. 937 – 995).
In 995, a quarrel broke out between Haakon  and Olaf Tryggvason (ca 960 –1000) just as Olaf had arrived back in Norway. 
Hoping for a reward, Tormod Kark killed Haakon and brought his head to Olaf who would become king of Norway.
The murder happened at Rimul in Melhus. However, as a punishment for betraying his lord, Kark was himself decapitated, and his head reputedly sat on a stake in Munkholmen alongside Haakon's head. The events are described in the Saga of King Olaf Tryggvason.

See also 
 Jarlshola
 Rimul

References

10th-century Icelandic people
Executed Icelandic people
Medieval slaves
Slavery in Norway